TAT2 could refer to :

 TAT2 neutraceutical - see cycloastragenol
 TAT-2, a transatlantic communications cable.